Hedon is a small town and civil parish in the East Riding of Yorkshire, England.

Hedon may also refer to:

 Hedon (UK Parliament constituency), in the East Riding of Yorkshire, England
 Hedon Aerodrome, an airfield in operation intermittently between 1912 and the late 1950s in the East Riding of Yorkshire
 John Hedon (1378–1386), an English Member of Parliament between 1378 and 1386
Claire Hédon (born 1962), French activist and politician
 Hedon, a unit of measurement used in felicific calculus
 "Hedon", a song from the 1997 album The Mind's I by Swedish melodic death metal band Dark Tranquillity

See also 
 Heddon (disambiguation)